William Tans'ur (or Tansur, Tanzer, Letansur) (6 November 1706, Dunchurch – 7 October 1783, St. Neots) was an English hymn-writer, composer of West gallery music, and teacher of music. His output includes approximately a hundred hymn tunes and psalm settings and a Te Deum. His manual A New Musical Grammar (1746) was still popular in the nineteenth century.

Life
Tans'ur was born in Dunchurch, Warwickshire to Edward Tanzer, a labourer, and Joan Alibone. In 1730 he married Elizabeth Butler and moved to Ewell, near Epsom. They had at least two sons. He taught psalmody in various places in the south-east of England, before moving to St Neots in Cambridgeshire, where he worked as a bookseller and music teacher, and spent the last forty years of his life.

Works
 A Compleat Melody, or The Harmony of Sion, 1734 
 The Melody of the Heart, 1737 
 Heaven on earth, or the Beauty of Holiness, 1738 
 Sacred Mirth, or the Pious Soul's Daily Delight, 1739 
 Poetical Meditations, 1740 
 The Universal Harmony, containing the Whole Book of Psalms, 1743 
A New Musical Grammar, 1746 
 The Royal Melody Compleat, 1754–5 (8 editions, revised as The American Harmony, 1771)
 The Psalm Singer's Jewel, or Useful Companion to the Book of Psalms, 1760 
 Melodia Sacra, or the Devout Psalmist's Musical Companion, 1771 
 The Elements of Music Displayed, 1772

Influence on early American sacred music
The unorthodox harmonic idiom of the Yankee tunesmiths ("First New England School") of choral composers shows the influence of English composers such as Tans'ur and Aaron Williams:
For the most part the Yankee composer's source of information about harmonic practices derived from the music and writings on music of such comparatively unskilled English composers as William Tans'ur (1706-1783) and Aaron Williams (1731-1776), who were themselves somewhat outside the mainstream of European sacred music. Many of the traits that may be thought unique to American psalmodists in fact characterize the compositions of their British cousins too.
In particular, "it is clear that [William Billings] had studied the works of English psalmodists such as William Tansur and Aaron Williams."

References

External links
 Biography at the Cyber Hymnal
 
 

Christian hymnwriters
1706 births
1783 deaths
English hymnwriters
English classical composers
People from the Borough of Rugby
People from St Neots
People from Ewell
Classical composers of church music
English music theorists
Musicians from Cambridgeshire
English male classical composers
18th-century classical composers
18th-century British male musicians